Pococera is a genus of snout moths in the subfamily Epipaschiinae, found mainly in North and Central America. It was described by Philipp Christoph Zeller in 1848.

Species
These 86 species belong to the genus Pococera:

 Pococera adolescens Dyar, 1914
 Pococera aelredella Schaus, 1922
 Pococera africalis Hampson, 1906
 Pococera agatha Schaus, 1922
 Pococera albiceps Hampson, 1906
 Pococera albimedium Schaus
 Pococera albulella Hampson, 1896
 Pococera antilocha Meyrick, 1936
 Pococera aplastella Hulst, 1888 (aspen webworm)
 Pococera arizonella Barnes & Benjamin, 1924
 Pococera asperatella (Clemens, 1860) (maple webworm)
 Pococera atristrigella Ragonot, 1893
 Pococera baptisiella Fernald, 1887
 Pococera baradata Schaus
 Pococera basalis E. D. Jones, 1912
 Pococera basigera Dyar
 Pococera basilissa Schaus, 1922
 Pococera beroella Schaus
 Pococera callipeplella Hulst, 1888
 Pococera capnodon Dyar, 1914
 Pococera cataldusa Schaus, 1925
 Pococera chrysoderas Dyar
 Pococera corumba Schaus, 1922
 Pococera crinita Schaus
 Pococera cuthmana Schaus, 1922
 Pococera cyrilla Schaus, 1922
 Pococera dolorosella Barnes & Benjamin, 1924
 Pococera elegans Schaus
 Pococera euphemella Hulst, 1888 (mesquite leaf tier)
 Pococera expandens (Walker, 1863) (double-humped pococera moth)
 Pococera febianalis Schaus
 Pococera floridella Hulst, 1900
 Pococera fuscolotella Ragonot, 1888 (syn: Salebria nigricans Hulst, 1900)
 Pococera gelidalis Walker [1866]
 Pococera gibbella Zeller, 1848
 Pococera griseella Barnes & Benjamin, 1924
 Pococera gybriana Schaus, 1925
 Pococera hemimelas Hampson, 1906
 Pococera hermasalis Schaus, 1925
 Pococera humerella Ragonot, 1888
 Pococera insularella Möschler
 Pococera internigralis Dognin, 1909
 Pococera iogalis Schaus, 1922
 Pococera irrorata Schaus
 Pococera jovita Schaus, 1922 (misspelling jovira)
 Pococera lamonti Schaus
 Pococera limalis Schaus
 Pococera maritimalis McDunnough, 1939
 Pococera marmorata Schaus
 Pococera marthusa Schaus
 Pococera melanogrammos Zeller, 1872 (black-letter pococera moth)
 Pococera mesoleucalis Hampson, 1916
 Pococera militella Zeller, 1848 (sycamore webworm)
 Pococera narthusa Schaus, 1913
 Pococera nepomuca Schaus, 1925
 Pococera nigribasalis Hampson, 1906
 Pococera nigrilunalis Dognin
 Pococera noctuina Schaus
 Pococera nocturna Schaus, 1922
 Pococera notabilis Schaus
 Pococera olivescens Schaus
 Pococera pallidifusa Dognin
 Pococera platanella Clemens, 1860
 Pococera polialis Hampson, 1906
 Pococera provoella Barnes & Benjamin, 1924
 Pococera robustella Zeller, 1848 (pine webworm)
 Pococera sabbasa Schaus, 1922
 Pococera sadotha Schaus, 1922
 Pococera scabridella Ragonot, 1888
 Pococera scortealis Lederer, 1863 (white-aproned pococera moth)
 Pococera semnialis (C. Felder, R. Felder & Rogenhofer, 1875)
 Pococera spaldingella Barnes & Benjamin, 1924
 Pococera speciosella Hulst, 1900
 Pococera sphaeraphora Dyar
 Pococera stenipteralis Hampson
 Pococera subcanalis Walker, 1863 (cloaked pococera moth)
 Pococera subviolascens Hampson, 1906
 Pococera tertiella Dyar
 Pococera texanella Ragonot, 1888
 Pococera thoracicella Barnes & Benjamin, 1924
 Pococera tiltella Hulst, 1888
 Pococera vacciniivora Munroe, 1963
 Pococera vandella Dyar, 1914
 Pococera vedastella Schaus
 Pococera venezuelensis Amsel
 Pococera viridis Druce, 1910

References

Epipaschiinae
Pyralidae genera